"Turn to Stone" is a 1972 song by the American singer-songwriter Joe Walsh and his band Barnstorm, with writing credits given to Terry Trabandt, and Walsh. The song was originally released on the album Barnstorm.

Walsh later covered the song on his 1974 solo album So What, and released it as a single.  Cash Box said that it showed off Walsh's "pyrotechnic guitar abilities" and commented on the "broad, swooping chords and accented rhythm section."  Record World said that "simultaneously realistic and reticent message lyrics blend with a rock symphony on its own terms." The single peaked at #93 on the US Billboard chart.

In 1976, Walsh recorded it on his You Can't Argue with a Sick Mind live album.

The Eagles played the song frequently on their Hotel California and The Long Run tours between 1976 and 1980.

Cover versions
 Roy Buchanan covered the song on his 1978 album You're Not Alone.
 Crippled Black Phoenix covered the song on their 2016 album Bronze with guest vocals from Arvid Jonsson
 Kenny Wayne Shepherd covered the song on his 2019 release, The Traveler and the 2020 release Straight to you Live (track 9)
 Fireball Ministry covered the song on the 2006 Small Stone Records compiliation Sucking the 70's - Back in the Saddle Again

References

1971 songs
Joe Walsh songs
Songs written by Joe Walsh
Song recordings produced by Bill Szymczyk